Tzedek  may refer to:

Tzedek (charity), a UK-based Jewish charity targeting global poverty
Shir Tzedek (born 1989), Israeli footballer

See also
Tzedek ve-Shalom, hishoric synagogue in Paramagibo Suriname
 Tzadik (disambiguation)